Jack Hawkins (born 6 October 1985) is an English actor, known for his work on the BBC One series Call the Midwife and the HBO Max series Raised by Wolves.

Early life 
He was born in Ipswich and was educated at the Ipswich School between 1996 and 2004, where he was Head Boy. He read Jurisprudence at Balliol College, Oxford and trained at the London Academy of Music and Dramatic Art from 2007 to 2009.

Career
Hawkins has performed acting roles in film, on television and on the stage. In 2017 he joined the cast of the BBC television show Call the Midwife as Christopher Dockerill. He plays the recurring character Alex Lambert in the BBC medical drama Holby City, and appeared as Mickey Aluffi in the 2016 film The Head Hunter, and Phil in Writers Retreat. In 2014 Hawkins played the part of William in the film The Cross, which was filmed in various locations in northern England. He appeared in Trevor Nunn's adaptation of Sebastian Faulk's novel Birdsong, and Cheek by Jowl's 2012-3 production of 'Tis Pity She's a Whore. In 2015, he appeared in Lindsay Posner's West End production of Harvey alongside Maureen Lipman and James Dreyfus.

Filmography

Films

Theatre

Video games

References

External links

1985 births
Living people
People educated at Ipswich School
Actors from Ipswich